The 1999 NBA playoffs was the postseason tournament of the National Basketball Association’s 1998-99 season. The tournament concluded with the Western Conference champion San Antonio Spurs defeating the Eastern Conference champion New York Knicks 4 games to 1. Tim Duncan was named NBA Finals MVP.

The 1999 Playoffs are memorable in that a #8 seed (the Knicks) made it to the Finals for the only time in history, and that it came after a lockout-shortened 50-game season.

Overview
The  Philadelphia 76ers’ and Milwaukee Bucks returned to the playoffs since 1991 (coincidentally they faced each other in the opening round that year), and it was also the 76ers’ first appearance since drafting Allen Iverson with the #1 overall pick in 1996. Iverson later led the Sixers to the 2001 NBA Finals. 

After spending their first thirteen seasons in Sacramento in mediocrity, with no winning record and two playoff appearances in 1986 and 1996, the Kings franchise made the first of eight consecutive playoff appearances, which included a trip to the Western Conference Finals in 2002.

The Bulls, despite being defending champions, missed the playoffs for the first time since 1984 (mostly due to the second retirement of Michael Jordan and the departures of Scottie Pippen and Dennis Rodman). They also became the first defending champion since the 1969–70 Boston Celtics to miss the playoffs.

With their first round sweep of the Phoenix Suns, the Portland Trail Blazers won a playoff series for the first time since 1992, when they last made the NBA Finals.

Game 4 of the Lakers–Rockets series was the final postseason appearance of Charles Barkley’s Hall of Fame career. It was also the final playoff game ever held at the Compaq Center.

Game 5 of the Hawks–Pistons series is the last NBA playoff game played in a college basketball-specific arena (Georgia Tech's then-named Alexander Memorial Coliseum), and among the final NBA games played in a college basketball-specific arena. Many teams formerly played playoff games on college campuses, especially in the NBA's early days, but the increasing professionalization and ownership of arena times made the practice obsolete.

Game 5 of the Heat–Knicks series was extremely notable for two reasons
 Allan Houston's series winning shot to win the game and the series. By doing so, the Knicks became only the second eighth seeded team (after the 1994 Denver Nuggets) to knock off a top seed in the playoffs. The Knicks were eventually joined by the 2007 Golden State Warriors, the 2011 Memphis Grizzlies, and the 2012 Philadelphia 76ers as one of only five eighth seeded teams to eliminate a top seeded team in the playoffs.
 In addition, Game 5 was the last playoff game ever played at Miami Arena. The Heat continued to host regular season games there for part of the 1999–2000 season before moving to the American Airlines Arena in January 2000.

Game 4 of the Spurs–Lakers series was the last regulation NBA game ever played in the Great Western Forum. The Lakers played a handful of preseason games leading up to the 1999–2000 season before Staples Center became the new home of the team for that season. 

With their conference semifinals sweep of the Atlanta Hawks, the New York Knicks made the conference finals for the first time since 1994. The Knicks remain the only eighth seeded team (as of 2023) to advance past the conference semifinals. After losing to the Knicks, the Hawks did not return to the playoffs until 2008.

This was the last NBA postseason to feature back-to-backs in the conference semifinals until 2012.

Game 2 of the Spurs-Trail Blazers series was notable for the San Antonio Spurs overcoming an eighteen point deficit to win the game. The final shot, taken by Sean Elliott, completed what is called the “Memorial Day Miracle.”

With their Western Conference Finals sweep of the Portland Trail Blazers, the San Antonio Spurs made the NBA Finals for the first time in franchise history.

Game 5 of the Knicks–Pacers series was the last meaningful NBA game ever played at Market Square Arena.

With their Game 6 win over the Indiana Pacers, the New York Knicks became the first (and currently only) eighth seeded team to make the NBA Finals.

With their Game 2 win over the New York Knicks, the San Antonio Spurs won their 12th straight playoff game. The streak included back to back sweeps of the Lakers and Trail Blazers (who would meet in next year’s Western Conference Finals). This playoff winning streak has since been beaten by the Cleveland Cavaliers and the Golden State Warriors in 2017, although the Cavs started their streak by winning the final three games of the 2016 NBA playoffs.

With their Game 5 win against the New York Knicks at Madison Square Garden, the San Antonio Spurs became the first former ABA team to win an NBA Championship. Although the Spurs had home-court advantage throughout the playoffs, they played more road games (nine) than home games (eight), as all their series were won on the road. In addition, the Spurs finished 15–2 for a postseason record previously equalled by the 1991 Chicago Bulls and beaten only by a 15–1 playoff record with the only loss in overtime from the Los Angeles Lakers in 2001, and by a 16–1 playoff record from the Golden State Warriors in 2017. Both of the Spurs losses came against #8 seeded teams.

For the first time since 1991, no series went seven games. As of 2023, this remains the most recent NBA postseason not to feature a Game 7.

Bracket

First round

Eastern Conference first round

(1) Miami Heat vs. (8) New York Knicks

 Allan Houston hit the series-winning shot with 0.8 seconds left to complete the Knicks first-round upset against the Heat. By winning the decisive Game 5, the Knicks became the first team in NBA history to defeat a top 2 seed in the First Round in consecutive seasons (coincidentally, both times were against the Heat). Conversely, the Heat became the first team in NBA history to not past the First Round as a top 2 seed in consecutive seasons while also becoming the second #1 seed to lose a playoff series against a #8 seed in the First Round.

This was the third playoff meeting between these two teams, with each team winning one series apiece.

(2) Indiana Pacers vs. (7) Milwaukee Bucks

This was the first playoff meeting between the Pacers and the Bucks.

(3) Orlando Magic vs. (6) Philadelphia 76ers

This was the first playoff meeting between the Magic and the 76ers.

(4) Atlanta Hawks vs. (5) Detroit Pistons

This was the eighth playoff meeting between these two teams, with the Hawks winning four of the first seven meetings.

Western Conference first round

(1) San Antonio Spurs vs. (8) Minnesota Timberwolves

This was the first playoff meeting between the Timberwolves and the Spurs.

(2) Portland Trail Blazers vs. (7) Phoenix Suns

This was the sixth playoff meeting between these two teams, with the Suns winning three of the first five meetings.

(3) Utah Jazz vs. (6) Sacramento Kings

This was the first playoff meeting between the Kings and the Jazz.

(4) Los Angeles Lakers vs. (5) Houston Rockets

This was the sixth playoff meeting between these two teams, with the Rockets winning three of the first five meetings.

Conference semifinals

Eastern Conference semifinals

(2) Indiana Pacers vs. (6) Philadelphia 76ers

This was the second playoff meeting between these two teams, with the 76ers winning the first meeting.

(4) Atlanta Hawks vs. (8) New York Knicks

This was the second playoff meeting between these two teams, with the Knicks winning the first meeting.

Western Conference semifinals

(1) San Antonio Spurs vs. (4) Los Angeles Lakers

In Game 2, Tim Duncan hit a game-winning hook shot with 8.4 seconds remaining.

This was the sixth playoff meeting between these two teams, with the Lakers winning four of the first five meetings.

(2) Portland Trail Blazers vs. (3) Utah Jazz

This was the fifth playoff meeting between these two teams, with each team winning two series apiece.

Conference finals

Eastern Conference finals

(2) Indiana Pacers vs. (8) New York Knicks

In Game 2 Reggie Miller hit the game winning free throws with 2 seconds remaining

In Game 3 Larry Johnson makes a game-winning 4-point play with 5.7 seconds left.

This was the fifth playoff meeting between these two teams, with each team winning two series apiece.

Western Conference finals

(1) San Antonio Spurs vs. (2) Portland Trail Blazers

In Game 2, Sean Elliott hit a game-winning three-pointer with 9 seconds remaining.

This was the third playoff meeting between these two teams, with each team winning one series apiece.

NBA Finals: (W1) San Antonio Spurs vs. (E8) New York Knicks

The teams did not meet in the regular season.

This was the first playoff meeting between the Knicks and the Spurs.

References

External links
Basketball – Reference.com's 1999 Playoffs section

National Basketball Association playoffs
Sports in Portland, Oregon
Playoffs

fi:NBA-kausi 1998–1999#Pudotuspelit